Eli Hawks (January 15, 1829 – April 10, 1900) was an American politician and businessman.

Born in Georgetown, New York in Madison County, New York, Hawks moved to Juneau, Wisconsin in 1855 and opened a grain elevator. He served as mayor and treasurer of Juneau, Wisconsin. In 1878 and 1883, Hawks served in the Wisconsin State Assembly as a Republican. He died in Juneau, Wisconsin.

Notes

1829 births
1900 deaths
People from Madison County, New York
People from Juneau, Wisconsin
Businesspeople from Wisconsin
Mayors of places in Wisconsin
Members of the Wisconsin State Assembly
19th-century American politicians
19th-century American businesspeople